Dykesville is an unincorporated community in Claiborne Parish, Louisiana, in the United States.

A post office was established at Dykesville in 1886, and remained in operation until it was discontinued in 1906.

External Links

References

Unincorporated communities in Claiborne Parish, Louisiana
Unincorporated communities in Louisiana